This is a list of notable books written by writers hailing from or living in Uganda.

See also 
 List of Ugandan writers

References 

Kumusha
Uganda